Florent Fidèle Constant Bourgeois (5 June 1767, Guiscard – 26 June 1841, Paris) was a French landscape painter, engraver, and lithographer. He studied under David, but spent much of his time in Italy. Landon mentions him as an artist distinguished for the richness of his compositions and the purity of his style, and describes three of his pictures as being in the manner of Gaspard Poussin. He died at Passy (now in Paris), in June 1841.

References

 

1767 births
1841 deaths
18th-century engravers
18th-century French painters
19th-century engravers
19th-century French painters
French engravers
French expatriates in Italy
French male painters
People from Oise
Pupils of Jacques-Louis David
18th-century French male artists